Enoch Skidmore Gilchrist (25 December 1940 – 2008) was a Scottish footballer, who played for Berwick Rangers, Hamilton Academical and Dumbarton.

In 1971, he played abroad in Canada's National Soccer League with Hamilton Croatia, and returned for the 1972 season. He re-signed with Hamilton for the 1973 season, and for the 1974 season.

His elder brother John was also a footballer.

References

1940 births
Scottish footballers
Dumbarton F.C. players
Berwick Rangers F.C. players
Hamilton Academical F.C. players
Scottish Football League players
2008 deaths
Sportspeople from Wishaw
Association football wing halves
Wishaw F.C. players
Cumnock Juniors F.C. players
Hamilton Croatia players
Scottish Junior Football Association players
Canadian National Soccer League players
Footballers from North Lanarkshire
Scottish expatriates in Canada
Expatriate soccer players in Canada
Scottish expatriate sportspeople in Canada